Lewis Powell may refer to:
 Lewis F. Powell Jr. (1907–1998), Associate Justice of the Supreme Court of the United States
 Lewis Powell (conspirator) (1844–1865), conspirator with John Wilkes Booth
 Lewis Powell (MP) (1576–1636), Welsh politician
 Lewis W. Powell (1882–1942), American lawyer and politician

See also
Louis Powell (1902–1995), cricket player